Natalie Sourisseau (born 5 December 1992) is a Canadian field hockey player.

Sourisseau made her debut for the national team in 2011.

She represented Canada at the 2011 Pan American Games where the team came fourth, the 2015 Pan American Games where they won a bronze medal and at the 2019 Pan American Games where they won a silver medal. She competed at the 2013 Women's Pan American Cup where the team won another bronze medal.

She also competed in the 2018 Commonwealth Games where the Canadian team came in 5th place.

References

External links
 
 
 

1992 births
Living people
Canadian female field hockey players
Sportspeople from Kelowna
Field hockey players at the 2011 Pan American Games
Field hockey players at the 2015 Pan American Games
Pan American Games bronze medalists for Canada
Pan American Games medalists in field hockey
Field hockey players at the 2018 Commonwealth Games
Commonwealth Games competitors for Canada
Field hockey players at the 2019 Pan American Games
Pan American Games silver medalists for Canada
Medalists at the 2015 Pan American Games
Medalists at the 2019 Pan American Games
20th-century Canadian women
21st-century Canadian women